The IRI Achievement Award, established by the Industrial Research Institute (IRI) in 1973, is awarded "to honor outstanding accomplishment in individual creativity and innovation that contributes broadly to the development of industry and to the benefit of society." The recipient is first nominated by an IRI member organization for his or her invention, innovation, or process improvement, and then voted on by a nine-member Awards Committee, led by the immediate past-chairman of IRI's Board of Directors.

The bronze sculpture known as the IRI Achievement Award represents the flight of innovation. The artist who designed the sculpture is John Blair. This award is presented each spring during IRI's Annual Meeting and is one of the highest honors awarded by the organization.

List of Recipients

See also
 Industrial Research Institute
 Maurice Holland Award
 IRI Medal

References

External links
 Industrial Research Institute, Inc. (IRI)
 IRI Achievement Award

Business and industry awards